Chris Lemire (born November 3, 1983 in Edmonton, Alberta) is a Canadian soccer player.

Career

Professional
Lemire played professionally with the Calgary Storm, Montreal Impact and the Edmonton Aviators old USL First Division, and is the only former Aviator to play for both the old and new Edmonton professional soccer franchises.

Lemire was signed by FC Edmonton of the new North American Soccer League, and took part in their 2010 exhibition season in preparation for the team's entry into the NASL in 2011.

After playing professional indoor soccer for the Edmonton Drillers in the Canadian Major Indoor Soccer League in 2010, he made his debut for Edmonton in the team's first competitive game on April 9, 2011, a 2-1 victory over the Fort Lauderdale Strikers. The club released Lemire on October 12, 2011 after the conclusion of the 2011 season.

International
Lemire has international experience with the Canada men's national under-20 soccer team, including four games at the 2003 FIFA World Youth Championship.  He also represented his country as a member of the Canada national beach soccer team as they competed for the CONCACAF title in Mexico in 2006.

References

External links
 FC Edmonton bio
 Canada Soccer profile
 FIFA: Chris Lemire

1983 births
Living people
Canada men's under-23 international soccer players
Canada men's youth international soccer players
Canadian beach soccer players
Canadian soccer players
Calgary Storm players
Edmonton Aviators / F.C. players
Franco-Albertan people
Montreal Impact (1992–2011) players
FC Edmonton players
North American Soccer League players
Soccer players from Edmonton
A-League (1995–2004) players
USL First Division players
Association football forwards